MLGB (Medium-weight Laser Guided Bomb) is a  precision guided glide bomb that can attack both fixed and moving targets. It was developed by Israel Aerospace Industries (IAI). The relatively light warhead is optimized for such missions where minimum collateral damage is of high importance.

See also
 Small Diameter Bomb
 GBU-53/B
 AGM-154 Joint Standoff Weapon
 Spice (bomb)
 MSOV

References

Guided bombs of Israel
IAI products
Aerial bombs of Israel
Military equipment introduced in the 2010s